Galomecalpa secunda is a species of moth of the family Tortricidae. It is found in Ecuador (Morona-Santiago Province) and Peru.

References

Moths described in 2002
Moths of South America
Euliini
Taxa named by Józef Razowski